Ricardo González (13 October 1900 – 22 June 1947) was an Argentine bobsledder. He competed in the four-man event at the 1928 Winter Olympics.

References

1900 births
1947 deaths
Argentine male bobsledders
Olympic bobsledders of Argentina
Bobsledders at the 1928 Winter Olympics
Sportspeople from Buenos Aires